Ditopellina is a genus of fungi in the family Valsaceae. This genus is monotypic, containing the single species Ditopellina saccardiana.

References

External links

Diaporthales
Monotypic Sordariomycetes genera